Adrián Roberto Coria (born 16 May 1959) is an Argentine football manager, currently in charge of Newell's Old Boys' youth sides.

Coria is recognized as the first manager of Lionel Messi at Newell's before his move to Spain.

Career
After working as manager of Newell's Old Boys' youth sides for more than ten years, Coria joined Gerardo Martino's staff as one of his assistants in 2003, at Cerro Porteño. He also worked alongside Martino at Colón, Libertad, the Paraguay national team (where he was also in charge of the under-20 team), Newell's, Barcelona and the Argentina national team.

On 2 March 2017, Coria was named manager of Paraguayan side Sportivo Luqueño. He left on 10 April, and later started working as Mario Sciacqua's assistant at Patronato, Godoy Cruz and Sarmiento.

Coria returned to Newell's in November 2021, again in charge of the youth sides, along with Gustavo Tognarelli and Ariel Palena. On 29 August 2022, he was named interim manager along with Tognarelli, as Javier Sanguinetti resigned.

References

External links

1959 births
Living people
Sportspeople from Rosario, Santa Fe
Argentine football managers
Argentine Primera División managers
Newell's Old Boys managers
FC Barcelona non-playing staff
Argentine expatriate footballers
Argentine expatriate sportspeople in Paraguay
Argentine expatriate sportspeople in Spain
Expatriate football managers in Paraguay
Sportivo Luqueño managers